The Great Basin Research Station Historic District, in Ephraim Canyon near Ephraim, Utah, is a historic district that was listed on the National Register of Historic Places in 1996.

The noncontiguous district includes two complexes of buildings about three miles apart.

It is located off Ephraim Canyon Road, which in the past was denoted Utah State Route 29 before 29's routing was revised. The two areas combined have area of  area and include 13 contributing buildings, four contributing structures, one contributing object and three contributing sites.

Includes work designed by Architects of the United States Forest Service including a standard R-4 design building.

References

External links

National Register of Historic Places in Sanpete County, Utah
Historic districts on the National Register of Historic Places in Utah
Colonial Revival architecture in Utah
Buildings and structures completed in 1912